Dom is the thirteenth studio album by German singer Joachim Witt. It was released on 28 September 2012. There are several different versions including a standard version, a limited deluxe edition double album that contains an autobiography, a limited digital edition and vinyl records.  This includes the sampled "Retromania" songs on the deluxe edition. The track "Gloria" was released as a single.

Reception

Dom received mixed echoes in Germany. Rolling Stone delivered a negative review that criticised the electronic parts as being reminiscent of a Leni Riefenstahl film and called the album "kitsch". The Orkus magazine's reviewer noted some kitsch too but praised the theatrical lyrics in an overall very favourable review. He wrote that compared to the previous Bayreuth cycle that featured pain and anger, Witt had become more settled now. Also the Sonic Seducer's review was very positive while noting the quality of the songwriting and the instrumentation.

The album peaked at position 6 in the German Media Control Charts while the single "Gloria" reached number 74.

Track listing

References

Joachim Witt albums
2012 albums